Nikitinskaya is a rural locality (a village) in Vinogradovsky District, Arkhangelsk Oblast, Russia. The population was 5 as of 2010. There are 2 streets.

Geography 
Nikitinskaya is located on the Topsa River, 57 km southeast of Bereznik (the district's administrative centre) by road. Nizhnyaya Topsa is the nearest rural locality.

References 

Rural localities in Vinogradovsky District